Krivosheino is a rural locality (a selo) and the administrative center of Krivosheinsky District, Tomsk Oblast, Russia. Population:

History
In 1926 the setttlement had 51 households. After changing the course of the river Brovka by the decision of the Krivosheinsky District Executive Committee and changing the place of its confluence with the Ob river in 1970, active erosion of the left bank of the river and the collapse of the Krivosheinsky ravine began, which caused the destruction of the church building, according to the recollections of residents, in 1972-1973. The Soviet-Jewish dissident, Ida Nudel, was held in Krivosheno at the end of the 70s.

References

Notes

Sources

Rural localities in Tomsk Oblast